Juan Manuel Cat Piccardo (born 6  September 1996) is a Uruguayan rugby union player who generally plays as a fly-half represents Uruguay internationally. He was included in the Uruguayan squad for the 2019 Rugby World Cup which was held in Japan for the first time and also marked his first World Cup appearance.

Career 
He made his international debut for Uruguay against Germany on 12 November 2016.

References

External links

1996 births
Living people
Uruguayan rugby union players
Uruguay international rugby union players
Rugby union fly-halves
Rugby union players from Montevideo
Peñarol Rugby players
People educated at The British Schools of Montevideo